ISEB may stand for:

Information Systems Examination Board, former name of the examination awarding body of the British Computer Society
Independent Schools Examinations Board, UK body that sets the Common Entrance Examination
International Symposium On Environmental Biogeochemistry, presenters of the Wolf Vishniac Memorial Award for Young Researchers
Interdisciplinary Science and Engineering Building, former name of the Interdisciplinary Science and Engineering Complex at Northeastern University